R-25 regional road is a Montenegrin roadway.

History

Part of the road between Krstac and Međuvršje was reconstructed in 2019. 

In November 2019, the Government of Montenegro published bylaw on categorisation of state roads. With new categorisation, R-25 regional road was created from municipal road.

Major intersections

References

R-25